Justice Ford may refer to:

Thomas Ford (politician), associate justice of the Supreme Court of Illinois
G. Sarsfield Ford, associate justice of the Connecticut Supreme Court
Sam C. Ford, associate justice of the Montana Supreme Court